Inauguration of George Bush may refer to:

Inauguration of George H. W. Bush, 1989

See also